Dog Eat Dog is an Australian game show series based on the UK version aired on the Seven Network in 2002 until 2003. It was hosted by Simone Kessell. Ten episodes were filmed, but only two episodes were aired before it was taken off air, to be shown as during summer 2002-03.

Gameplay
Six contestants use the knowledge they gained from each other prior to filming to nominate each other to complete a challenge in the studio.

References

Seven Network original programming
2000s Australian game shows
2002 Australian television series debuts
2003 Australian television series endings
https://www.youtube.com/watch?v=LX7koKU_cPE